Johns Hopkins All Children's Hospital, formerly All Children's Hospital, is a pediatric acute care children's hospital located in St. Petersburg, Florida. The hospital has 259 beds and is affiliated with the USF Morsani College of Medicine and Johns Hopkins University School of Medicine. The hospital provides comprehensive pediatric specialties and subspecialties to pediatric patients aged 0–21 throughout western Florida. Johns Hopkins All Children's Hospital also features a Level 2 Pediatric Trauma Center.

In 2011, All Children's Hospital became the first center outside the Baltimore-Washington, D.C. area to integrate with the Johns Hopkins Health System. In 2016, it officially took the name Johns Hopkins All Children's Hospital.

History 
 
Johns Hopkins All Children's Hospital was founded in 1926 as the American Legion Hospital for Crippled Children to care for children with polio and other crippling disorders without regard for race, creed or ability to pay. 
In 1934, Lloyd Gullickson partnered with Babe Didrikson in a charity golf match against Glenna Collett-Vare and Babe Ruth which they won quite easily. The match raised $600 for the hospital. A number of gallery members were betting which of the "Babes" would hit the longest drive on each hole.

From 1936 to 1960, the hospital expanded by more than 5,000 square feet, adding physical therapy, educational therapy, surgical facilities, a full-time school teacher, a library, and school facilities. As the threat of polio decreased, hospital leaders planned for a future that included a wider variety of services. Construction began on the new facility in 1965 on land acquired from the City of St. Petersburg.

The new hospital opened its doors in 1967 with the new name All Children's Hospital. The name was based on the quote by Carl Sandburg, which states "There is only one child in all the world, and that child's name is all children."

In 2005, All Children's broke ground on construction of a 240-bed hospital and adjoining outpatient facility. This facility opened in 2010. It consisted of a 10-floor hospital and a seven-floor outpatient care center. In 2011, All Children's Hospital joined the Johns Hopkins Health System as a fully integrated member of Johns Hopkins Medicine. In 2016, the organization changed its name to Johns Hopkins All Children's Hospital and celebrated its 90th anniversary. Also in 2016, it broke ground on a $95-million Research and Education Building, which will become home to the institutes, house a new pediatric biorepository, provide lab and simulation training space, and encourage collaboration among clinicians, researchers, faculty and trainees. It will open in the fall of 2018.

In addition to the outpatient care center in St. Petersburg, the hospital has outpatient locations along Florida's west coast in Brandon, East Lake, Fort Myers, Lakeland, North Port, Pasco, Sarasota, South Tampa and Tampa.

About

Affiliations 
Johns Hopkins All Children's has 11 outpatient care centers in six counties on Florida's west coast and affiliations and collaborations with community and regional hospitals where Johns Hopkins All Children's physicians and protocols have direct impact on patient care.

An exclusive affiliation with AdventHealth Tampa that started in 2016 allows doctors from All Children's Specialty Physicians to provide pediatric care in cardiology, critical care, endocrinology, hematology/oncology, hospital medicine, general surgery, neonatology and pulmonology at that hospital. Several other AdventHealth locations in Pasco, Hillsborough and north Pinellas counties follow Johns Hopkins All Children's clinical pediatric protocols in their emergency centers. Johns Hopkins All Children's also collaborates with such hospitals as Sarasota Memorial, Brandon Regional, St. Petersburg General and others to provide specialty care to their patients. A collaboration with IMG Academy brings Johns Hopkins All Children's sports medicine and general health services to the academy's campus in Bradenton, Florida.

As a regional referral center for children, Johns Hopkins All Children's Hospital draws patients from throughout Florida, all 50 states and 36 foreign countries. It is one of four pediatric trauma centers in the state of Florida.

Controversy 
In November 2018 it was revealed that the mortality rate in its pediatric heart surgery program was at very high rate. The surgeons in the pediatric heart surgery program made serious mistakes and procedures went wrong in unusual ways. Surgeons in the program had lost needles in two infants’ chests and infection rates of patients spiked. The problems started after the departure of program leader Dr. James Quintessenza after hospital officials had disputes with him. The surgeons that were hired to replace Quintessenza were lackluster in their techniques and mortality rates tripled in a period of two years. Hospital officials decided to send complicated cardiac cases to other hospitals, but even routine cases also had very high mortality rates. After years of cover ups, officials at Johns Hopkins in Baltimore fired many top level hospital officials and the surgeons involved. After a detailed investigation in 2019, the Florida Department of Health fined the institution $804,000. The fine was the most any Florida hospital had ever received. The hospital has also settled with some of the 11 families affected by the program totaling around $40 million. Administrators have announced that the hospital will implement new policies and structural changes to address the core issues that allowed the troubled heart program to continue. The hospital has since started to rebuild by hiring back Quintessenza, and hiring other respected pediatric cardiothoracic surgeons.

Awards 
As of 2020-21 Johns Hopkins All Children's Hospital has placed nationally in all 8 out of 10 ranked pediatric specialties on U.S. News & World Report: Best Children's Hospital rankings. In addition, the hospital is ranked as the best children's hospital in Florida.

See also 

 List of children's hospitals in the United States
 Johns Hopkins Children's Center
 USF Morsani College of Medicine

References

External links 

 

Hospital buildings completed in 2010
Buildings and structures in St. Petersburg, Florida
Children's hospitals in the United States
Hospitals in Florida
Skyscrapers in Florida
1926 establishments in Florida
Pediatric trauma centers